Carlos Eduardo González Gallo (2 May 1930 – 18 July 2018) was an Uruguayan basketball player who competed in the 1956 Summer Olympics.

References

External links

1930 births
2018 deaths
Uruguayan men's basketball players
Olympic basketball players of Uruguay
Basketball players at the 1956 Summer Olympics
Olympic bronze medalists for Uruguay
Olympic medalists in basketball
Medalists at the 1956 Summer Olympics
20th-century Uruguayan people